Dowreh may refer to:
Dowreh County
Dowreh Rural District